Albert Thomas Tyson (June 1, 1892 in Wilkes-Barre, Pennsylvania – August 16, 1953 in Buffalo, New York) was an outfielder in Major League Baseball who played from 1926 through 1928 for the New York Giants and Brooklyn Robins.

External links

1892 births
1953 deaths
Major League Baseball outfielders
Baseball players from Pennsylvania
Sportspeople from Wilkes-Barre, Pennsylvania
New York Giants (NL) players
Brooklyn Robins players
Hamilton Hams players
Buffalo Bisons (minor league) players
Louisville Colonels (minor league) players
Scranton Miners players
Wilkes-Barre Barons (baseball) players
Burials in Buffalo, New York